Çakmak is a village in the Merkezefendi District of Denizli Province in Turkey. Population is 7,753 in 2021.

References

Merkezefendi District